A number of additional characters are used with the International Phonetic Alphabet by linguists documenting the languages of China and neighboring countries, especially linguists based in China.

Letters

Primary vowels
These letters are used by those who want symbols for five equally-spaced vowels in formant space.
 = central 
 = mid 
 = mid

Fricative vowels
These letters, sometimes mistakenly called "apical", derive from Karlgren, from a turned .
 = 
 = 
 = 
 =

Alveolo-palatal consonants
 = 
 = 
 = 
 =

References

International Phonetic Alphabet